Adamson may refer to:

 Adamson (surname), list of people
 Adamson, taxonomic author abbreviation for British botanist Robert Stephen Adamson (1885–1965)
 Adamson (automobile), an English automobile model
 Adamson (comic strip) or Silent Sam, a Swedish comic strip by Oscar Jacobsson
 Adamson Awards, a Swedish comics award
 Adamson, Kansas
 Adamson, Oklahoma, a ghost town in Pittsburg County, Oklahoma, US
 Adamson University, a university in Manila, Philippines
 W. H. Adamson High School, a high school in Texas, U.S.

See also

 Adamson v. California, a U.S. Supreme Court legal suit
 
 Adamsen
 Adamsson
 Adams (disambiguation)
 Adam (disambiguation)
 Son (disambiguation)
 Sons of Adam (disambiguation)